The Central England Temperature (CET) record is a meteorological dataset originally published by Professor Gordon Manley in 1953 and subsequently extended and updated in 1974, following many decades of painstaking work. The monthly mean surface air temperatures, for the Midlands region of England, are given (in degrees Celsius) from the year 1659 to the present.

This record represents the longest series of monthly temperature observations in existence. It is a valuable dataset for meteorologists and climate scientists. It is monthly from 1659, and a daily version has been produced from 1772. The monthly means from November 1722 onwards are given to a precision of 0.1 °C. The earliest years of the series, from 1659 to October 1722 inclusive, for the most part only have monthly means given to the nearest degree or half a degree, though there is a small 'window' of 0.1 degree precision from 1699 to 1706 inclusive. This reflects the number, accuracy, reliability and geographical spread of the temperature records that were available for the years in question.

Data quality 
Although best efforts have been made by Manley and subsequent researchers to quality control the series, there are data problems in the early years, with some non-instrumental data used. These problems account for the lower precision to which the early monthly means were quoted by Manley. Parker et al. (1992) addressed this by not using data prior to 1772, since their daily series required more accurate data than did the original series of monthly means. Before 1722, instrumental records do not overlap and Manley used a non-instrumental series from Utrecht compiled by Labrijn (1945), to make the monthly central England temperature (CET) series complete. 

For a period early in the 21st century there were two versions of the series: the "official" version maintained by the Hadley Centre in Exeter, and a version that was maintained by the late Philip Eden which he argued was more consistent with the series as originally compiled by Manley.

The warmest year on record was recorded in 2022, with an average temperature of 11.15 degrees Celsius. This beat the previous 2014 record by 0.2 degrees and was almost 2 degrees over the 1961-1990 average

Trends revealed by the series

During the eighteenth and nineteenth centuries, a cool period which coincided with cool winters and generally cool summers, the temperatures fluctuated widely but with little trend. From 1910, temperatures increased until about 1950, when they flattened before a sharp rising trend began in about 1975.

Both the general warming trend and the hottest year on record at the time, 2014, have been attributed to human-caused climate change using observational and climate model-based techniques. This record was subsequently broken in 2022, when a mean CET of 11.15 C was recorded, 1.68 degrees above the 1961-90 average and breaking the 2014 record by nearly 0.2 Celsius.

Extremes
Taking the 364-year period for the series as a whole:

Hottest

Coldest

Mean, maximum and minimum temperatures
Since 1878, the Central England temperature has recorded daily maximum and minimum temperatures; its daily mean records began in 1772. The tables below show the record average max/min for each season and each calendar month since 1878.

Highest minimum

Lowest minimum

Highest maximum

Lowest maximum

Daily records
Daily mean temperatures have been available since 1772, with max and min data available from 1878 onward.

Highest mean

Highest minimum

Highest maximum

Lowest mean

Lowest minimum

Lowest maximum

See also
Climate of the United Kingdom
England and Wales Precipitation

Notes

References

Further reading
G. Manley, "Central England temperatures: monthly means 1659 to 1973.", Quarterly Journal of the Royal Meteorological Society,  vol. 100, pp. 389–405 (1974).
D.E. Parker, T.P. Legg and C. Folland, "A new daily Central England Temperature series 1772-1991," Int. J. Climatol., vol. 12, pp. 317–342 (1992).
Graphs of the series at the University of East Anglia
Freely downloadable text file containing the data.
Met Office Hadley Centre CET pages

Climate of England
Climate change in the United Kingdom
Meteorological data and networks